Stigmella rosaefoliella is a moth of the family Nepticulidae. It is found in North America in Ohio, Pennsylvania, Arkansas, New York, Michigan, Missouri and Ontario.

The wingspan is about 4.5 mm. There are three generations per year with full grown larvae in June and early July, in August and in October.

The larvae feed on Rosa species. They mine the leaves of their host plant. The mine is serpentine and usually much contorted, frequently closely following the edge of the leaf in its early course, with a broad line of frass. The larvae are green. The cocoon is yellowish brown and much flattened.

This species was first described by James Brackenridge Clemens in 1861.

Subspecies
Stigmella rosaefoliella rosaefoliella (Ohio, Pennsylvania, Arkansas, New York, Michigan, Missouri, Ontario)
Stigmella rosaefoliella pectocatena (Ontario)

References

External links
Nepticulidae of North America
A taxonomic revision of the North American species of Stigmella (Lepidoptera: Nepticulidae)

Nepticulidae
Moths of North America
Moths described in 1861

Leaf miners
Taxa named by James Brackenridge Clemens